Osmondmania! is a compilation album by The Osmonds released in 2003.  It contains hit songs from The Osmonds (Alan, Wayne, Merrill, Jay and Donny) as well as Donny's solo hits, Marie's solo hits and Donny & Marie's duet hits. Although Jimmy Osmond appears on the album cover, none of his material was featured.

Track listing

References

2003 compilation albums
The Osmonds albums
MGM Records compilation albums